Richard Magenis may refer to:

Richard Magenis (died 1807) (–1807), Anglo-Irish politician
Richard Magenis (died 1831) (–1831), Anglo-Irish politician
Richard Henry Magenis (1832–1880),  High Sheriff of Antrim